The Asia/Oceania Zone was one of three zones of regional competition in the 2010 Fed Cup.

Group I
Venue: National Tennis Centre, Kuala Lumpur, Malaysia (outdoor hard)
Dates: 3–6 February

The eight teams were divided into two pools of four teams. The teams that finished first in the pools played-off to determine which team would partake in the World Group II Play-offs. The two nations coming last in the pools also played-off to determine which would be relegated to Group II for 2011.

Pools

Play-offs

  advanced to 2010 World Group II Play-offs.
  was relegated to Group II for 2011.

Group II
Venue: National Tennis Centre, Kuala Lumpur, Malaysia (outdoor hard)
Dates: 3–6 February

The seven teams were divided into one pool of three teams and one pool of four. The top team of each pool played-off against each other to decide which nation progress to the Group I.

Pools

Play-offs

  advanced to Group I for 2011.

See also
Fed Cup structure

References

 Fed Cup Profile, Thailand
 Fed Cup Profile, Uzbekistan
 Fed Cup Profile, Singapore
 Fed Cup Profile, Hong Kong
 Fed Cup Profile, Japan
 Fed Cup Profile, Philippines
 Fed Cup Profile, South Korea
 Fed Cup Profile, India
 Fed Cup Profile, Kazakhstan
 Fed Cup Profile, Syria
 Fed Cup Profile, New Zealand

External links
 Fed Cup website

 
Asia Oceania
Sport in Kuala Lumpur
Tennis tournaments in Malaysia
2010 in Malaysian tennis